Taste receptor type 2 member 19 is a protein that in humans is encoded by the TAS2R19 gene. It seems to be involved in the perception of salt and bitter tastes.

See also
 Taste receptor

References

Further reading

Human taste receptors